The 2003 If Stockholm Open was a men's tennis tournament played on indoor hard courts at the Kungliga tennishallen in Stockholm, Sweden and was part of the International Series of the 2002 ATP Tour. The tournament was held from 20 October through 26 October 2003. Fifth-seeded Mardy Fish  won the singles title.

Finals

Singles

 Mardy Fish defeated  Robin Söderling 7–5, 3–6, 7–6(7–4)
 It was Fish's first singles title of his career.

Doubles

 Jonas Björkman /  Todd Woodbridge defeated  Wayne Arthurs /  Paul Hanley 6–3, 6–4
 It was Björkman's 4th title of the year and the 38th of his career. It was Woodbridge's 4th title of the year and the 80th of his career.

References

External links
 Official website 
 ATP tournament profile
 ITF tournament edition details

 
If Stockholm Open
Stockholm Open
October 2003 sports events in Europe
op
2000s in Stockholm